Jody Wynn ( Anton, born February 21, 1974) is an American women's basketball coach. She was head coach at the University of Washington from 2017 to 2021 and at  Long Beach State from 2009 to 2017.

High school
Jody Wynn was a prep standout in high school in Southern California. Her initial plans were to concentrate on swimming in high school with the goal of becoming an Olympic swimmer. However, while still in fifth grade, she was playing basketball when the head coach of Brea Olinda High School basketball team Mark Trakh (now the current University of Southern California women's coach), approached her with some shooting tips and encouraged her to think about playing basketball when she reached high school. She did commit to playing basketball and played for Trakh, starting every game in winning three straight championships. Although she was the tallest player on the team he had her playing at the two guard position.  She earned the CIF-Southern Section and Orange County Player of the Year honors in 1991 and 1992. She was also tabbed a USA Today and  Street & Smith's Honorable-Mention All-American.

Wynn played Forward and was a four-year starter on the varsity squad. She scored 16 points per game as a senior. In her four years, the team had a 129–6 record and won three California state championships.

College
Wynn graduated from the University of Southern California in 1996, earning her Bachelor's degree in Exercise Science. In 2000, she completed a Master's degree in Education at Pepperdine University.

During her collegiate playing career (1993–96), the USC Trojans earned a cumulative record of 79-35 (.693). This team, which was headlined by notable WNBA players Lisa Leslie and Tina Thompson, won the 1994 Pac-10 Conference Championship. 

The Trojans made three consecutive NCAA Tournament appearances from 1993 to 1995. During this time, Wynn played under three head coaches – Marianne Stanley (1993), Cheryl Miller (1994–95) and Fred Williams (1996) – in a four-year span. Wynn's best statistical season was during her junior year, where she started in 27 games and averaged 8.2 points, 5.0 rebounds, and 3.0 assists per contest. Her senior year at USC was cut short by a career-ending ankle surgery.

Coaching career

On April 7, 2009, Wynn was named Head Coach of the Long Beach State Women's Basketball program. On April 14, 2017, she was named Head Coach of the Washington Women's Basketball program. Wynn was fired by the University of Washington on March 15, 2021.

Head coaching record

Personal life

In 2000, Jody married Derek Wynn. They have two daughters. 

Before taking up basketball, Wynn competed in girls' water polo and open-water swimming events. Her father played American football at Occidental College under, while her mother was a U.S. Women's Amateur Golf champion.

References

1974 births
Living people
American women's basketball coaches
Female sports coaches
Long Beach State Beach women's basketball coaches
Pepperdine Waves women's basketball coaches
USC Trojans women's basketball coaches
USC Trojans women's basketball players
Washington Huskies women's basketball coaches
Basketball coaches from California
Basketball players from California